Gurudev is a 1993 Bollywood action film produced and directed by Vinod Mehra. The film started production in the late 1980s and was left incomplete after Vinod Mehra's death in October 1990. Raj Sippy took over as director and completed it for release in 1993.

The film stars Rishi Kapoor, Anil Kapoor, Sridevi in lead roles. Pran, Danny Denzongpa, Kader Khan, Kiran Kumar appear in supporting roles.

Plot
Inspector Dev and Gaurav, fondly called "Guru" are childhood friends. While Dev is with the police, Parshuram, works with the underworld and is the right-hand man of Khakan, a criminal don who is Guru's father.

When Inspector Khan is assigned the case of apprehending Khakan, his first suspect is Dev himself. Dev must prove to Khan that he is earnest and will not hesitate to arrest Khakan. It remains to be seen if Dev will apprehend his friend's father or just play around.

Cast

 Rishi Kapoor as Inspector Dev
 Anil Kapoor as Gaurav "Guru"
 Sridevi as Priya / Sunita / Rosy (Double Role)
 Kader Khan as Inspector Khan
 Kiran Kumar as Bhola Pandey
 Danny Denzongpa as Khakan
 Pran as Parshuram
 Satyendra Kapoor as Satyen
 Seema Deo as Saraswati
 Chandrashekhar as Police Commissioner
 Harish Patel as Police Inspector
 Mahavir Shah as Mahaveer Pandey
 Tej Sapru as Murli Pandey
 Gurbachan Singh as Gurbachan
 Mac Mohan as Mac
 Asrani as Sur Pakde
 Shammi as Sur Tali
 Viju Khote as Pathan
 Mehmood Jr. as Postman

Soundtrack
The music of the film was composed by R. D. Burman with lyrics penned by Majrooh Sultanpuri.

External links 
 

1990s Hindi-language films
1993 films
1990s action films
Indian action films
Films scored by R. D. Burman
1993 action films